Compton was a former provincial electoral district in the Estrie region of Quebec, Canada.  It elected members to the National Assembly of Quebec (earlier known as the Legislative Assembly of Quebec).

It was created for the 1867 election (and a district of that name existed earlier in the Legislative Assembly of the Province of Canada).  Its final election was in 1970.  It disappeared in the 1973 election, when it merged with Mégantic to form the Mégantic-Compton electoral district.

Members of the Legislative Assembly / National Assembly
 James Ross, Conservative Party (1867–1871)
 William Sawyer, Conservative Party (1871–1886)
 John McIntosh, Conservative Party (1886–1894)
 Charles McClary, Conservative Party (1894–1897)
 James Hunt, Liberal (1897–1900)
 Allan Wright Giard, Conservative Party (1900–1912)
 Georges Nathaniel Scott, Liberal (1912–1919)
 Camille-Émile Desjarlais, Liberal (1919–1923)
 Jacob Nicol, Liberal (1923–1929)
 Andrew Ross McMaster, Liberal (1929–1931)
 William James Duffy, Liberal (1931–1935)
 Payson Sherman, Conservative Party - Union Nationale (1935–1939)
 William James Duffy, Liberal (1939–1946)
 Charles Daniel French, Union Nationale (1946–1954)
 John William French, Union Nationale (1954–1956)
 Fabien Gagnon, Liberal (1956–1957)
 Claude-Gilles Gosselin, Union Nationale (1957–1970)
 Omer Dionne, Liberal (1970–1973)

External links
 Election results (National Assembly)
 Election results (QuebecPolitique.com)

Former provincial electoral districts of Quebec